International Plaza and Bay Street is the dominant shopping mall and dining destination on the west coast of Florida, located adjacent to the Tampa International Airport. 

International Plaza is a traditional enclosed shopping mall anchored by Dillard's, Neiman Marcus, and Nordstrom

Bay Street, a more modern open-air shopping center, is anchored by Restoration Hardware, and primarily features restaurants including The Capital Grille, The Cheesecake Factory, and Bar Louie among others. A Renaissance Hotel, with 293 rooms and 12,500 square feet (1,160 m2) of meeting space, connects directly to Bay Street.

History
Plans for International Plaza first began in 1986, begun by real estate developer Dick Corbett first through International Plaza Ltd, and later Concorde Cos., partnering with Taubman Cos. The mall is built on 150 acres of land southeast of Tampa International Airport, part of which was originally an 18-hole Hall of Fame golf course. In 1998,Lord & Taylor and Nordstrom were publicly announced as anchors followed by Neiman Marcus shortly thereafter. Dillard's was announced as the fourth and final anchor in late 1998. A million square foot office plaza was proposed that same year. Sordoni Skanska, the US subsidiary of Skanska, was awarded the contract to construct the mall in 1999.

In early 2001, it was announced that the mall had signed its first 100 tenants, with 65 of them being new to the Tampa area. An 11,000 square foot (1,022 m2) Cheesecake Factory was announced in June 2001. The mall opened to little fanfare on September 14, 2001, due to the September 11 attacks only 3 days prior, however the mall began to succeed despite this. The mall's Lord & Taylor closed in July 2004, with plans already announced to replace it with a Robb & Stucky furniture store which opened in February 2005. The Renaissance Hotel, attached to Bay Street, opened in August 2004.

Robb & Stucky closed due to bankruptcy in 2011, with upscale fitness gym LifeTime Athletic taking over the store in 2014. Fashion retailer H&M opened at the mall on November 10, 2011.

See also
 WestShore Plaza, a mall located one mile away down Westshore Boulevard
 Hyde Park Village, open-air shopping district in Hyde Park

References

External links
 

Shopping malls in Florida
Taubman Centers
Buildings and structures in Tampa, Florida
Tourist attractions in Tampa, Florida
Shopping malls established in 2001
2001 establishments in Florida